The 2016 season of the IFSC Climbing World Cup was the 18th season of the competition. Bouldering competitions were held at the seven stops of the IFSC Climbing World Cup. The bouldering season began on April 15 at the World Cup in Meiringen, and concluded on 12 June at the World Cup in Munich. At each stop a qualifying was held on the first day of the competition, and the semi-final and final rounds were conducted on the second day of the competition. The winners were awarded trophies, the best three finishers received medals, and prize money was awarded to the top six finishers at each stop.

At the end of the season an overall ranking was determined based upon points, which athletes were awarded for finishing in the top 30 of each individual event. Shauna Coxsey won the overall women's World Cup and Tomoa Narasaki won the overall men's World Cup.

Meiringen, Switzerland (15–16 April)

Women 
59 athletes attended the World Cup in Meiringen. Shauna Coxsey (3t5 4b6) won the competition in front of Mélissa Le Nevé (2t4 4b6).

Men 
84 athletes attended the World Cup in Meiringen. Alexey Rubtsov (2t6 3b10) won the competition in front of Martin Stráník (2t6 2b6).

Kazo, Japan (23–24 April)

Women 
53 athletes entered the competition in Kazo. Just as at the previous World Cup Shauna Coxsey (4t7 4b7) won the competition in front of Mélissa Le Nevé (2t2 4b5).

Men 
69 athletes attended the World Cup in Kazo. Rustam Gelmanov (3t3 4b4) won the competition in front of Michael Piccolruaz (2t2 4b8).

Chongqing, China (30 April–1 May)

Women 
37 athletes attended the World Cup in Chongqing. For the third time in a row Shauna Coxsey (3t7 4b8) won, this time in front of Akiyo Noguchi (3t12 4b13).

Men 
63 athletes attended the men's competition of the World Cup in Chongqing. Tomoa Narasaki (3t8 3b4) won in front of Jan Hojer (2t3 4b13).

Navi Mumbai, India (14–15 May)

Women 
38 athletes attended the World Cup in Navi Mumbai. Miho Nonaka (2t4 3b6) won in front of Monika Retschy (1t1 4b10). Shauna Coxsey, winner of the three previous World Cups this season, was eliminated in the semi-final.

Men 
42 athletes attended the World Cup in Navi Mumbai. Kokoro Fujii (3t4 4b4) won in front of Tomoa Narasaki (3t6 4b7).

Innsbruck, Austria (21–22 May)

Women 
68 athletes attended the World Cup in Innsbruck. Shauna Coxsey (4t8 4b8) won her fourth World Cup of the season. Janja Garnbret (4t10 4b9) came in second.

Men 
108 athletes attended the World Cup in Innsbruck. Jongwon Chon (3t4 3b4) won in front of Tomoa Narasaki (2t9 4b13).

Vail, United States (11–12 June)

Women 
47 athletes attended the World Cup in Vail. Megan Mascarenas (4t5 4b5) won in front of Shauna Coxsey (3t4 4b7). Coxsey's second place secured that she would win the overall 2016 Bouldering World Cup regardless of her finish at the final World Cup in Munich.

Men 
58 athletes attended the World Cup in Vail. Kokoro Fujii (2t4 3b5) won in front of Tomoa Narasaki (1t1 4b7).

Munich, Germany (11–12 June)

Women 
84 athletes attended the World Cup in Munich, making it the largest competition of the season. Miho Nonaka (3t7 4b8) won in front of Shauna Coxsey (2t2 3b3), who had already secured the overall seasonal title at the previous stop in Vail.

Men 
140 athletes attended the World Cup in Munich, making it the largest competition of the season. By virtue of winning the Munich competition Tomoa Narasaki (4t6 4b5) won his fifth consecutive medal at World Cups this season, thus  also claiming the overall seasonal title. 2015 seasonal champion Jongwon Chon (3t5 3b3) finished second.

Final ranking

Women

Men

National teams

References 

IFSC Climbing World Cup
2016 in sport climbing